Nancowry Taluk (or Tehsil) is one of 7 local administrative divisions of the Indian district of Nicobar, part of the Indian union territory of Andaman and Nicobar Islands.

It is a division known locally as a tehsil, roughly equivalent to a county in its range of administrative powers. It is located in the Nicobar Islands, and incorporates the entire island of Nancowry. It is overseen by Assistant Commissioners stationed at Malacca.

Nancowry tehsil's population according to 2011 Census of India figures was 1019, all on Nancowry Island.

Tehsils of the Andaman and Nicobar Islands
Nicobar district